Strawberry Field is a Salvation Army property and visitor attraction in the Liverpool suburb of Woolton. It operated as a children's home between 1936 and 2005. The house and grounds had originally been built as a private residence in the Victorian era, before being acquired by the Salvation Army in the 1930s. The house was demolished in 1973 due to structural problems and replaced with purpose-built units. After being closed as a children's home, the site has continued to be used by the Salvation Army for other purposes.

The location gained worldwide fame following the release of the Beatles' 1967 single "Strawberry Fields Forever". The song's writer, John Lennon, had grown up nearby and played in the grounds of the home as a child. In time, the old red-painted entrance gates on Beaconsfield Road became a place of pilgrimage for Beatles fans. In 2019, Strawberry Field was opened to the public for the first time, with an exhibition on its history, cafe, and shop, alongside a training centre for young people with special educational needs.

The gates were stolen on 11 May 2000, allegedly by two men in a transit van. The gates were sold to an unsuspecting antiques dealer who never realised they were the actual gates from Strawberry Field. He returned them to the police upon request, and they now stand in the grounds of Strawberry Field.

History
The earliest reference to the Gothic Revival mansion Strawberry Field dates from 1870, when it was owned by wealthy shipping magnate George Warren. On an 1891 Ordnance Survey map, the building and its grounds appear as the plural Strawberry Fields, although this had changed by the 1905 survey. In 1912, it was transferred to another wealthy merchant whose widow sold the estate to the Salvation Army in 1934. It opened as a children's home on 7 July 1936 by Lady Bates in the presence of General Evangeline Booth, daughter of Salvation Army founder William Booth. With a capacity of up to 40 girls, boys under the age of five were introduced in the 1950s. Later, older boys also became resident.

The Beatles

The name of the home became famous in 1967 with the release of the Beatles' single "Strawberry Fields Forever", written by John Lennon, who had grown up at nearby 251 Menlove Avenue. Beaconsfield Road, where Strawberry Field is located, is a side street from Menlove Avenue. One of Lennon's childhood treats was the garden party that took place each summer, on the grounds of Strawberry Field. Lennon's Aunt Mimi recalled, "As soon as we could hear the Salvation Army Band starting, John would jump up and down shouting, 'Mimi, come on. We're going to be late.'"

Lennon would often scale the walls of Strawberry Field to play with the children in the Salvation Army home.  The proprietors complained to his school about his antics but to no avail. Finally, they took him to his Aunt Mimi, with whom he was living. She told him that if he continued to do this, they would hang him. He continued anyway, thus the lyric, "Nothing to get hung about, Strawberry Fields forever."

Legacy

Strawberry Field was recognised by Nikolaus Pevsner in his 1969 survey of the buildings of South Lancashire. However, by then, the building was increasingly unfit for purpose. By 1973, structural problems such as dry rot meant that it was more cost-effective to demolish the building and replace it with a purpose-built children's home. This new home provided three family units, each accommodating 12 children. The driveway entrance to the building was moved further west along Beaconsfield Road so the gateposts bearing the name of Strawberry Field were no longer used. Throughout the 1970s and beyond, the disused entrance and its gates became a mecca for Beatles fans from around the world. As a result, the gates continued to be painted bright red; the painted nameplates were also maintained.

The children's home closed in January 2005, and the building was used by the Salvation Army as a church and prayer centre. The famous gates marking its entrance were removed and replaced with replicas in May 2011. The Salvation Army opened Strawberry Field to the public for the first time in September 2019, allowing visitors to explore the grounds. Incorporated in the grounds is a training centre for young people with special educational needs and a new exhibition space dedicated to the story of the place, together with a cafe and shop.

See also
Strawberry Fields in New York City's Central Park, a memorial to John Lennon

References

External links

1936 establishments in England
Former buildings and structures in Liverpool
Orphanages in the United Kingdom
Salvation Army buildings
Salvationism in England
Tourist attractions in Liverpool
History of the Beatles